Sistema Brasileiro de Televisão (SBT) is a Brazilian free-to-air television network, funded on August 19, 1981, by the businessman and TV host Silvio Santos. The network was established after a public competition of the federal government for the creation of two new television networks, created from revoked concessions of the extinct networks Tupi and Excelsior. SBT was funded in the same day that the concession agreement was signed, and that the act was broadcast live by the network, so that this was its first aired program.

Currently, SBT is the second most watched television network in Brazil, after Rede Globo. Throughout its existence, the network always occupied this space in the audience ranking, except between 2007 and 2014, when Rede Record took the post. SBT has about 8 owned and operated stations and 90 affiliated stations throughout the Brazilian territory, the network is also available through pay television operators (cable and satellite), by the free-to-air signal available in broadcast and satellite receivers, and also through streaming media in its mobile application (Android, iOS and Windows Phone), apps for smart TVs and in its website. Also on their website, the programming is available in video on demand for free, also available on the video-sharing site YouTube since 2010.

SBT broadcast in its programming a wide variety of television genres, whereas its own material generally stand adjacent to the entertainment. Foreign programming, is made up of mainly the telenovelas produced by the Mexican channel Televisa, and American TV series. It is the only commercial television broadcaster in Brazil which airs children's programming, even arranging a partnership deal with The Walt Disney Company, in which the company provides two hours of daily programming for the network. SBT also broadcast television news, producing in all three daily newscasts, a weekly news program and a weekly newscast.

Current programming

Reality shows

Game shows

News programming 
 Conexão Repórter (2010–present)
 Jornal da Semana SBT (2013–present)
 Primeiro Impacto (2016–present)
 SBT Brasil (2005–present)
 SBT News na TV (2023-present)
 SBT Praça (1999–present)

Talk and variety shows 
 Casos de Família (2004–present)
 Domingo Legal (1993–present)
 Eliana (2009–present)
 Fofocalizando (2016 as "Fofocando"–present)
 Notícias Impressionantes (2020-present)
 Operação Mesquita (2017-present)
 A Praça É Nossa (1987–present)
 Programa do Ratinho (1998-2006; 2009–present)
 Programa Raul Gil (1981-1984; 2010-present)
 Programa Silvio Santos (1981-2001; 2008–present)
 The Noite com Danilo Gentili (2014–present)

Children's programming 
 Sábado Animado (1995–present)

Seasonal programs 
 Feriadão SBT (2011–present)
 Retrospectiva (2002–present)
 SBT Folia (2011–present)
 Teleton (1998–2022, 2023-)
 Troféu Imprensa (1982–present)

Series 
 Henry Danger
 ICarly
 Jack Ryan
 The Fresh Prince of Bel-Air
 Victorious

Movie blocks 
 Cine Espetacular (2000–present)
 Tela de Sucessos (1997–present)

Sports 
 Copa do Nordeste (2018-present)
 UEFA Champions League (2021–present)
 UEFA Europa League (2021–present)
 UEFA Supercup (2021–present)
 CONMEBOL Sudamericana (2023-preset)
 Arena SBT (2014; 2020–present)
 SBT Sports (2021–present)

Prize draw 
 Tele Sena (1991–present)

Telenovelas 
 A Dona 
 Marisol
 Pequena Travessa
 Poliana Moça
 Vencer o Desamor
 Cúmplices de um Resgate

Upcoming programming 
 Acontece lá em Casa (September 2016)
 As Aventuras de Poliana (2018-2020)
 Carinha de Anjo (remake; 2016)
 Chiquititas (rerun; September 2016)
 Copa de Mundo 2024 (Novbero 2023)

Former programming
 Jornal do SBT (1991–2016)
 Bom Dia & Companhia (1993–2022)
 Carrossel Animado (2007-2013; 2015-2016; 2016–2017)
 Mundo Disney (2015-2018)

Reality shows/Game shows
 Bake Off Brasil
 Júnior Bake Off Brasil
 Bake Off Brasil Celebrity
 BBQ Brasil (BBQ Champ)
 Hell's Kitchen: Cozinha sob Pressão
 Roda a Roda Jequiti (Wheel of Fortune)
 Programa Silvio Santos (Takeshi's Castle)
 Passa ou Repassa (Double Dare) - (Domingo Legal)
 Pra Ganhar É Só Rodar
 Fábrica de Casamentos
 Jogo das Fichas
 Nada além de Um Minuto (Minute to Win It)
 Rola ou Enrola? - (Eliana)
 Fenômenos - (Eliana)
 Esquadrão da Moda (What Not to Wear)
 Bomba! (Boom!) - (Programa Silvio Santos)
 Cabelo Pantene - O Reality (2017-2018)
 Qual é o Seu Talento? (What's Your Talent?)
 Caldeirão da Sorte (2016-2017)
 Duelo de Mães (2016-2017)
 Dance se Puder (2016) - (Eliana)
 Máquina da Fama (2013-2017)
 Esse Artista Sou Eu (Your Face Sounds Familiar) (2014)
 Festival Sertanejo (2013-2014)
 Menino de Ouro (Football's Next Star) (2013-2014)
 Famoso Quem? (My Name Is) (2013)
 Vamos Brincar de Forca (2012-2013)
 Cante se Puder (Sing If You Can) (2011-2013)
 Se Ela Dança, Eu Danço (So You Think You Can Dance) (2011-2012)
 Esquadrão do Amor (2011-2012)
 Um Milhão na Mesa (The Million Pound Drop) (2011)
 Cantando no SBT (2011)
 SOS Casamento (2011)
 Romance no Escuro (Dating in the Dark) (2010-2011) - (Eliana)
 Solitários (Solitary) (2010)
 Meu Pai é Melhor que Seu Pai (My Dad Is Better Than Your Dad) (2010)
 Topa ou Não Topa (Deal or No Deal) (2006-2011)
 Um Contra Cem (1 vs. 100) (2009-2010)
 Você Se Lembra? (Amne$ia) (2009-2010)
 10 Anos Mais Jovem (10 Years Younger) (2009)
 Identidade Secreta (Identity) (2009)
 Só Falta Esposa (2009)
 Astros (2008-2013)
 Supernanny (2008-2010)
 Nada Além da Verdade (The Moment of Truth) (2008-2010)
 Quem Manda É o Chefe (2008-2009)
 High School Musical: A Seleção (2008)
 Tentação (2007-2009)
 Você É mais Esperto que um Aluno da Quinta Série? (Are You Smarter than a 5th Grader?) (2007-2008)
 Quem Perde, Ganha (The Biggest Loser) (2007)
 Vinte e Um (Twenty One) (2007)
 Namoro na TV (The Dating Game) (2007)
 Curtindo com Reais (2007)
 Curtindo com Crianças (2007)
 Você É o Jurado (2007)
 Ídolos (SBT) (Idols) (2006-2007)
 Bailando por um Sonho (2006)
 Family Feud Brasil (Family Feud) (2005-2006)
 Casamento à Moda Antiga (2005-2006)
 O Grande Perdedor (2005)
 O Conquistador do Fim do Mundo (2003)
 Xaveco-Se Rolar...Rolou (Singled Out) (1996-2001-2003-2004)
 Todos contra Um (2002-2005)
 Popstars Brasil (Popstars) (2002-2003)
 Ilha da Sedução (Temptation Island) (2002-2003)
 Sete e Meio (Seven and a half) (2002)
 Curtindo uma Viagem (2001-2002)
 Casa dos Artistas (Protagonistas) (2001-2002-2004)
 Audácia (Greed) (2000)
 Qual É a Música? (The Singing Bee) (1999-2008)
 Qual é a Musica? (Name That Tune) (1999-2005)
 Show do Milhão (Million Show) (1999-2009; 2021)
 Nações Unidas (1992-1993)
 Cidade contra Cidade (1988-1989)
 Casa dos Segredos (Secret Story) (future)
 Cinquenta (50–50) (uncertainty)

References

External links 
 
 SBT schedule

 
SBT
SBT